Pinki may refer to:

Boško Palkovljević Pinki, People's Hero of Yugoslavia
Pinki (comics), cartoon character created by Pran Kumar Sharma
Pinki Hall, sports hall in Belgrade, Serbia
Piņķi, village in Latvia
 Pinki Sonkar, the main character of Academy Award-winning documentary, Smile Pinki (2008)
 Pinki - or Pinchi -, alias of the italian lyricist Giuseppe (Pino) Perotti (1900-1971)
Pinki (bowls), (born 1980), Indian lawn bowler